Tibetan Sign Language is the recently established deaf sign language of Tibet.

Tibetan Sign is the first recognized sign language for a minority in China.  The Tibetan Sign Language Project, staffed by members of the local deaf club, was set up under the supervision of Handicap International in 2001 to create a standardized language, based primarily on the existing sign language of Lhasa, as a replacement for the regional sign languages of Tibet.  For example, the deaf of Nagqu have a well developed vocabulary for livestock, while those of Lhasa have more specialized vocabulary for urban life.  The standard was announced by the Chinese government in 2004. 

Xinhua explained that Chinese Sign Language was not practical because deaf Tibetans do not know Chinese characters, and that club members will introduce the new standard throughout Tibet. A Tibetan manual alphabet was created by club members from the Tibetan alphabet without exposure to foreign forms of fingerspelling.

References

The Tibetan Sign Language Project of the Tibetan Deaf Association (archived 2009)

Sign language isolates
Languages of Tibet
Sign languages of China